Clifford Antonio Russell (born February 8, 1979) is a former American football wide receiver. He was waived by the Denver Broncos on February 11, 2009.

Russell was drafted by the Washington Redskins in the third round of the 2002 NFL Draft. Russell has also been a member of the Cincinnati Bengals, Miami Dolphins, and Detroit Lions. He played college football at Utah.

Following his NFL career, he founded and has operated Ripped Performance, a fitness center in Ashburn, Virginia.

References

External links
Denver Broncos bio

1979 births
Living people
Sportspeople from Fayetteville, North Carolina
Sportspeople from Hawaii
American football wide receivers
Utah Utes football players
Washington Redskins players
Cincinnati Bengals players
Miami Dolphins players
Detroit Lions players
Denver Broncos players